The Lupenians or Lpins were a historical tribe that lived in modern-day Republic of Azerbaijan in antiquity. The Lupenians were mentioned in several sources in different languages. They are equated with Pliny's Lupenii, dwelling south of the tribe of Silvii (Chola), just next to the Diduri and near the frontier of Caucasian Albania. Agathangelos renders their name in Greek as Lifénnioi. The Ravenna Cosmography mentions their land as "Patria Lepon" situated next to Iberia and the Caspian Sea. The Tabula Peutingeriana also mentions the Lupenii. Vladimir Minorsky proposed later Arabic versions as well. They were probably related to the Caucasian Albanians.

Location 
Scholars Suren Yeremian and Tengiz Papuashvili proposed Iberia, especially the coast of the Alazan river, as a possible dwelling location of the Lupenians. However, Robert Hewsen opposed the idea and suggested their location as near modern Shamakhi, Azerbaijan, instead. The Lupenians were visited by Bishop Israel, Albanian emissary to the North Caucasian Huns. The History of the Country of Albania mentions them as people professing the Christian faith. Likewise, at least two catholicoi of the Caucasian Albanian Church - Ter Abas and Viro - were titled Catholicos of Albania, Lupenia and Chola, hinting at the faith of three neighboring regions. Russian historian Igor Semenov put their location near Layzan. Most recently, Murtazali Gadjiev proposed the Shakki region as the location of the Lupenians.

Society 
The tribe was headed by a chief, whose title was referred to as Lbinshāh by Ibn Khordadbeh.

References 

Tribes in Greco-Roman historiography
Caucasian Albania